Gabrovizza (Slovene: Gabrovec) is a village in the Comune di Sgonico (Province of Trieste) in the Italian region Friuli-Venezia Giulia, located about 10 kilometres (7 mi) northwest of Trieste, on the border with Slovenia.

Name

Points of interest 
 Info

References

See also 
 Karst Plateau

Province of Trieste
Cities and towns in Friuli-Venezia Giulia